Coronation Street is a British soap opera first broadcast on ITV on 9 December 1960. The following is a list of characters introduced in 2022, by order of first appearance. All characters are introduced by the programme's series producer, Iain MacLeod. Frank Bardsley (Simon O'Brien) joined in May as a love interest for Sean Tully (Antony Cotton). Jodie Prenger was cast as Glenda Shuttlworth, the sister of George (Tony Maudsley) and began appearing in August. She was then followed by Dee Dee Bailey (Channique Sterling-Brown) who debuted in September. Additionally, multiple other characters appeared throughout the year.

Frank Bardsley

Frank Bardsley, played by Simon O'Brien, made his first appearance on 27 May 2022. O'Brien began filming for Coronation Street in March 2022, with his casting being announced two months later. It was confirmed that O'Brien had been contracted as a guest star and would be appearing for a "couple of months". O'Brien, having appeared on the Channel 4 soap Brookside as Damon Grant in the 1980s, said that returning to a soap opera was difficult and a "learning curve" for him since the industry had changed so much. It was confirmed by Digital Spy's Daniel Kilkelly that Frank would be a love interest for established character Sean Tully (Antony Cotton). The pair meet whilst Sean is working at the Rovers Return Inn and Frank begins flirting with him.  Sean is initially reluctant to go on a date with Frank but eventually overcomes his insecurities and begins a relationship with Frank. It later emerges that Frank bullied Sean’s housemate, George Shuttleworth (Tony Maudsley) whilst they were at school together. Frank claims to be remorseful for his actions but George is unconvinced. Despite warnings from George, Sean continues to date Frank until he catches him bullying his son, Dylan Wilson (Liam McCheyne) and immediately breaks up with him.

Coronation Street producers told Kilkelly that Frank has hidden depths. The backstory involves a childhood connection to George, "who knows details about his past and is wary of him". Kilkelly wondered if Frank would still be the same person George knew or if he had changed. This connection was later revealed as Frank having bullied George in school. Jenny Connor (Sally Ann Matthews) urges Sean to pursue his relationship with Frank, but Digital Spy's Susannah Alexander hinted that their relationship will not be "plain sailing".

O'Brien told Inside Soap that throughout his career, he has always wanted to "have a pint in the Rovers" since he felt it is an iconic landmark for the acting industry. Sarah Ellis of the magazine asked him if he was enjoying playing Frank, to which he said that he could not think of a better character to play. He explained that he loves playing light and comedic scenes, which he felt were the "basis of Corrie", but appreciated that below that, Frank is a flawed character, which he enjoyed from an acting perspective. He was also asked if he was worried about a negative reception from viewers. O'Brien admitted that he feared backlash from fans of both George and Sean and joked that he "may have to lay low for a while".

Glenda Shuttleworth

Glenda Shuttleworth, played by Jodie Prenger, made her first appearance on 5 August 2022. Prenger's casting was announced on 20 June 2022 and her character was confirmed to be the sister of established character George Shuttleworth (Tony Maudsley). Glenda is first seen outside the funeral directors before a funeral is about to take place. George is unwell and cannot deliver the service himself, so Glenda arrives in perfect timing. She is also helped by Sean Tully (Antony Cotton). After the service is over, George meets Glenda in the pub and is pleased to see her. He introduces her to Todd (Gareth Pierce) and Eileen Grimshaw (Sue Cleaver); Glenda compliments Eileen on the smell of her perfume and buys her a drink.

Dee Dee Bailey

Dee Dee Bailey, played by Channique Sterling-Brown, made her first appearance on 28 September 2022. Sterling-Brown's casting details were announced on 4 September, while the character has been mentioned by her on-screen family since their introduction in 2019. The show's producer Iain MacLeod admitted to being a fan of the character before she "physically existed" just by hearing her description from the Bailey family. Dee Dee is a lawyer, and MacLeod stated that viewers could expect "a certain amount of chaos. She's got an incredibly big heart. She's incredibly competent at her job, but you'd never guess that to meet her." MacLeod said Dee Dee would be involved in a major storyline, but she would not be hiding a "dark secret" like most newly introduced characters. He explained "She's so exuberant and just seems so bulletproof and impervious to the travails of modern life that she dusts herself down and gets on with it. I didn't want to discover that she's got some terrible burden." He thought that it was a "refreshing" decision and allowed the character to be "incredibly joyous." He believed the audience would take to her.

Other characters

References

External links
 Cast and characters at itv.com
 Cast and characters at the Internet Movie Database

Coronation Street
2022
, Coronation Street